The 2019 Gravesham Borough Council election took place on 2 May 2019 to elect members of the Gravesham Borough Council in Kent, England. It was held on the same day as other local elections. The Labour Party gained control of the council from the Conservative Party.

Summary

|-

Ward results

Central

Chalk

Coldharbour

Higham

Istead Rise

Meopham North

Meopham South and Vigo

Northfleet North

Northfleet South

Painters Ash

Pelham

Riverside

Riverview

Shorne, Cobham & Luddesdown

Singlewell

Westcourt

Whitehill

Woodlands

References

2019 English local elections
May 2019 events in the United Kingdom
2019
2010s in Kent